Dr. Isaac Cleto Hassan is a South Sudanese physician and politician. He has served as Minister of Health of Western Bahr el Ghazal since 18 May 2010.

References

South Sudanese politicians
Living people
South Sudanese physicians
People from Western Bahr el Ghazal
Year of birth missing (living people)
Place of birth missing (living people)